This Bibliography covers sources for Royal Navy history through the 18th and 19th centuries. Some sources may be duplicated in sections when appropriate. Among the contemporary and earlier historical accounts are primary sources, historical accounts, often derived from letters, dispatches, government and military records, captain's logs and diaries, etc., by people involved in or closely associated to the historical episode in question. Primary source material is either written by these people or often collected, compiled, and/or written and published by other editors also, sometimes many years after the historical subject has passed. Primary sources listed in this bibliography are denoted with an uppercase bold ' (P)  before the book title. Publications that are in the public domain and available online for viewing in their entirety are denoted with E'Book.

Royal Navy
 Adams, James Truslow (1940). EMPIRE ON THE SEVEN SEAS THE BRITISH EMPIRE, Charles Schriber & Sons, New York, 409 pages; E'book
 Adkins, Roy; Adkins, Lesley (2008). The War for All the Oceans:From Nelson at the Nile to Napoleon at Waterloo Penguin Books, 560 pages, Book (par view)
 Albion, Robert Greenhalgh, (1926), Forests and Sea Power: The Timber Problem of the Royal Navy, 1652–1862, Volume 29, Harvard University Press, 485 pages, Book (snippit view)
Allen, Joseph (1853). Battles of the British navy, Volume 1Henry G. Bohn, London, 532 pages, E'book
 Archibald, Edward H. H.  (1968), The wooden fighting ship in the Royal Navy, A.D. 897–1860, Blandford P., 174 pages, Book (snippit view)
Barnes, Ian Barnes (2000). The Historical Atlas of the American RevolutionPsychology Press, 208 pages,  Book (par view)
 E'book
 E'book
 E'book
  E'book
 E'book

 Book (par view)
Colomb, Philip Howard (1905). The battle of TrafalgarW. Clowes & sons, limited, p. 18, E'book
 E'book
Fraser, Edward (1906). The enemy at Trafalgar: an account of the battle from eye-witnesses' narratives and letters and despatches from the French and Spanish fleetsE.P.Dutton & Co., New York, p. 436, E'book

 Goodwin, Peter G. (1987). The Construction and Fitting of the English Man of War: 1650–1850, Naval Institute Press, p. 276, Book (par view)
 Fremont-Barnes, Gregory. (2007) The Royal Navy 1793–1815 (Battle Orders) Osprey Publishing, p. 96,  excerpt and text search
 Harrison, Cy (2019) Royal Navy Officers of the Seven Years War: A Biographical Dictionary of Commissioned Officers 1748-1763Helion and Company, p. 584 Publishers Website 
 Hill, J.R. (2002). The Oxford Illustrated History of the Royal NavyOxford University Press, p. 496, Book (par view)
James, William Milbourne (1926). The British Navy in Adversity: A Study of the War of American Independence,
Longmans, Green and Co., Ltd, London, p. 459, Url

 —— (1948). The influence of sea power on the history of the British people University Press, p. 71, Url
James, William The naval history of Great Britain. There are two major edition the first was a five volume (London Baldwin, Cradock & Joy, 1822–1824). Listed here is the "new edition" in six volume with preface first published in London, April 1859 are available online for viewing at the Internet Archive and as they were published in 1902 are in the public domain (copyright expired):

 
 
 
 

Knight, Roger (2005) The Pursuit of Victory: The Life and Achievement of Horatio NelsonBasic Books, New York, p. 874 , Url
 Lavery, Brian  (1984), The Ship of the Line: The development of the battlefleet 1650–1850, Conway Maritime Press, p. 224, E'Book
 —— (1987). Arming and Fitting of English Ships of War, 1600–1815, Naval Institute Press, p. 319, Url
 —— (1991). Building the Wooden Walls: The Design and Construction of the 74-Gun Ship Valiant, Naval Institute Press, p. 206, Url
Lincoln, Margarette Lincoln (2002). Representing the Royal Navy: British Sea Power, 1750–1815Ashgate Publishing, Ltd, p. 226,  Url

 E'Book
 
 E'Book
 Protheroe, Ernest (2010). The British Navy: Its Making and Its MeaningBiblioBazaar, p. 736, Url
 Url
 Richmond, Herbert (1913). Papers Relating to the Loss of Minorca in 1756Navy Records Society
 —— (1920). The Navy in the War of 1739-48Cambridge University Press, E'Book
  —— (1931). The Navy in India, 1763-1783
  Url
 —— (1989). The wooden world: an anatomy of the Georgian navyWilliam Collins Sons & Co., London.  p. 445 , Url
 E'Book
 E'Book
 Stevens, William Oliver; Westcott, Allan Ferguson (1920), A History of Sea Power, George H. Doran Company, p. 428, E'Book
Stout, Neil R. (1962). The Royal Navy in American Waters, 1760–1775, Volume 2University of Wisconsin—Madison, p. 888, Url
—— (1973). The Royal Navy in America, 1760–1775: A Study of Enforcement of British Colonial Policy in the Era of the American RevolutionNaval Institute Press, Annapolis. p. 227, Url
 Stenzel, Alfred (1898) The British NavyT. Fisher Unwin, London, p. 327, E'Book
 E'Book
 Vincent, Edgar (2003). Nelson: Love & Fame (Biography & Autobiography) Yale University Press, p. 640, Url
 E'Book
 Winfield, Rif (2010):
(i) British Warships in the Age of Sail 1603 – 1714: Design Construction, Careers and Fates, p. 314, Url
(ii) British Warships in the Age of Sail 1714-1792: Design, Construction, Careers and Fates (2007) .
(iii) British Warships in the Age of Sail 1793-1817: Design, Construction, Careers and Fates (2005. Second edition in 2008) .
(iv) British Warships in the Age of Sail 1817-1863: Design, Construction, Careers and Fates. (2014) .

Yonge, Charles Duke (1863). The history of the British Navy: from the earliest period to the present time:in two volumes, Volume 2Richard Bentley, 1863, p. 809, E'Book

Admiral Nelson

 Adkin, Mark (2007). The Trafalgar Companion: A Guide to History's Most Famous Sea Battle and the Life of Admiral Lord NelsonAurum Press, London; p. 560, Url
Bennett, Geoffrey Martin (1972). Nelson, the commanderScribner,  p. 322, Url
 Bradford, Ernle (2012), Nelson: The Essential Hero, E-reads/E-rights, p. 436, Url
 E'Book Url2
 Davies, David Tudor (1996). Nelson's navy: English fighting ships, 1793–1815Stackpole Books, Penn., p. 201, Url
 Goodwin, Peter (2002). Nelson's Ships: A History Of The Vessels In Which He Served: 1771 – 1805Conway Maritime Press, London; p. 312, Url
 Howarth, David ; Howarth, Stephen; (2004). Nelson: The Immortal Memory, p. 408, Url
Knight, Roger (2007). The Pursuit of Victory: The Life and Achievement of Horatio NelsonBasic Books, p. 936, Url
 Lavery, Brian  (1989), Nelson's Navy: The Ships, Men, and Organization, 1793–1815, Naval Institute Press, p. 352, Url
 Lee, Christopher (2005). Nelson and Napoleon, The Long Haul to TrafalgarHeadline books, 560 pages, Url
 Laughton, M.A., John Knox, (1886), (P) Letters and despatches of Horatio, viscount Nelson: duke of Bronte, vice admiral of the White squadron , Longmans, Green, 456 pages, E'Book
 Longridge, Charles Nepean; Bowness. Edward, (1981), The Anatomy of Nelson's Ships, Naval Institute Press, 283 pages, Url
Mahan, Alfred Thayer  (1918). The life of Nelson: the embodiment of the sea power of Great BritainLittle, Brown and Co., Boston, 525 pages, E'book
 E'Book
 ——; Harris, Sir Nicholas, (P)  (1846). The Dispatches And Letters, Volume 7Henry Colburn, London, p. 814, E'Book
 E'Book
 ——; Maffeo, Steven E., Ed.; (P) (2007), Seize, burn, or sink: the thoughts and words of Admiral Lord Horatio Nelson, Scarecrow Press, 629 pages, Book
 E'Book
——, Warner & Hanna, Eds. (1806). Memoirs of the Life of the Late Lord H. NelsonFryer & Clark, Baltimore, 119 pages, E'book
 E'Book

Southey, Robert (1896). Robert Southey's Life of NelsonLongmans, Green, and Co., London, Bombay. p. 302, E'Book
 Walder, David (1978). Nelson: A BiographyDial Press/J. Wade, p. 538, Book
 Warner, Oliver, (1958). A portrait of Lord Nelson, Chatto & Windus, p. 372, Book
——, (1965). Nelson's BattlesB.T. Batsford Limited, p. 254, Book

Battle of Copenhagen
 Clark, James Stainer; M'Arthur, John (1810) The life of Admiral Lord Nelson, K.B., from his lordship's manuscriptsT. Bensley, London, 702 pages, E'Book, Url
Feldbæk, Ole (2002) The battle of Copenhagen: Nelson and the DanesNaval Institute Press, p. 270, Book
 Southey, Robert (1896) Robert Southey's Life of NelsonLongmans, Green, and Co., London, Bombay, p. 302, E'book

Battle of Trafalgar
 Book
 Adkins, Roy (2004) Trafalgar: The Biography of a BattleLittle Brown, 416 pages, Book

 E'Book
 Url
 Url
 Davies, David Tudor (1996). Nelson's navy: English fighting ships, 1793–1815Stackpole Books, Penn., p. 201, Url
 Url
 E'Book
 Url
 Url
 Url
 Url'
 Url
 Warwick, Peter (2005) Voices from the Battle of TrafalgarDavid & Charles, p. 320, Book
 —— (2011) TrafalgarDavid & Charles, p. 352, Book

See also

List of naval battles
List of Royal Navy ships
List of ship names of the Royal Navy (a full historical list)
List of early warships of the English navy
List of ships captured in the 18th century
List of ships captured in the 19th century
List of frigate classes of the Royal Navy
List of single-ship actions
Glossary of nautical terms

Notes
 

Naval battles involving Great Britain
Works about the Royal Navy
 Bibliography
Naval historians
History of the Royal Navy
Royal Naval history
19th-century history of the Royal Navy